Jean Marie Roney (born 1945) is a former Canadian international lawn bowler.

Bowls career
Roney has represented Canada at two Commonwealth Games at the 1994 Commonwealth Games and the 2006 Commonwealth Games.

She won two medals at the Asia Pacific Bowls Championships, including a gold medal in the 1993 fours in her home country. She has won 11 Canadian National titles.

Personal life
She is a forensic scientist by trade and is married to fellow international bowler Keith Roney.

References

Canadian female bowls players
1945 births
Living people
Bowls players at the 1994 Commonwealth Games
Bowls players at the 2006 Commonwealth Games
20th-century Canadian women